Raus may refer to:

 Erhard Raus (1889–1956), Austrian colonel general in the German Wehrmacht during World War II
 John Raus (born 1984), American former soccer player
 Raus, a 2nd century king of the Hasdingi Vandals allied with the Roman Empire
 Raus (Birs), Switzerland, a river